Makhambet Otemisuly (Mahambet Ötemısūly; ; 1804 – October 20, 1846) was a Kazakh poet and political figure. He is best known for his activity as a leader (with friend Isatay Taymanuly) of rebellions against Russian colonialism. This activity is believed to have resulted in his murder in 1846. His first rebellions took place against Zhangir-Kerey Khan of the Bukey Horde. Because the rebellion was badly defeated and a bounty was placed on Utemisov, he had to flee the region.

Makhambet's early education took place at a Russian language school in Orenburg. However, his poetry was more closely tied to Kazakh culture and literary tradition. The major themes of his poetry were of two types: political criticism of Russia or the khan, or more general poetry devoted to themes about human existence and life.

Bibliography
Ereuwil atqa er salmay: Olengder, edited by Qabibolla Sydyzov. Almaty, Kazakhstan: Zhazuushy. 1989

Sources 
Encyclopedic Biography of Makhambet Otemisuly
Kazakhstan Pravda Discussion on Makhambet's possible birthdates

Kazakh-language poets
1803 births
1846 deaths
Murder in 1846
19th-century poets